Commerce Street Historic District or West Commerce Street Historic District or variations may refer to:

Commerce Street Residential Historic District, Greenville, AL, listed on the NRHP in Alabama
East Commerce Street Historic District, Greenville, AL, listed on the NRHP in Alabama
Lower Commerce Street Historic District, Montgomery, AL, listed on the NRHP in Alabama
West Commerce Street Historic District (Greenville, Alabama), listed on the NRHP in Alabama
Hernando Commerce Street Historic District, Hernando, MS, listed on the NRHP in Mississippi
Commerce Street Historic District (West Point, Mississippi), listed on the NRHP in Mississippi
West Commerce Street Historic District (Aberdeen, Mississippi), listed on the NRHP in Mississippi
Commerce Street Industrial Historic District, Petersburg, VA, listed on the NRHP in Virginia